Patikabari Union is a union parishad of Kushtia Sadar Upazila,  in Kushtia District, Khulna Division of Bangladesh. There are 15 villages and 11 mouzas in the union.

References

External links
 

Unions of Khulna Division
Unions of Kushtia Sadar Upazila
Unions of Kushtia District